The Breithorn is a mountain of the Swiss Lepontine Alps, overlooking Simplon in the canton of Valais. It is part of the Monte Leone massif.

Climbing route
Breithorn is one of several peaks that can be climbed directly from the Simplon Pass. The other peaks are Wasenhorn, Hubschhorn, and Monte Leone. The route starts form the Simplon Hospiz and you will need glacier equipment for this mountain, crampons are compulsory. Plan around 5 hours from the road to the summit. This peak can be climbed in combination with Monte Leone.

Accommodation, huts and shelters
 Simplon Hospiz.
 Monte Leone Hut.
 Bivacco Farello on the Chaltwasser Pass.

Access road
The only access is the road to the Simplon Pass from Brig on the Swiss side and from Domodossola from the Italian side.

References

External links
 Breithorn on Hikr
 Breithorn: Route description on Mountains for Everybody

Mountains of the Alps
Alpine three-thousanders
Mountains of Switzerland
Mountains of Valais
Lepontine Alps